Bruny Island Premium Wines is Australia's most southern vineyard. It is located in the township of Lunawanna on Bruny Island. The winery produces Pinot noir, Chardonnay & apple cider on its  estate. A restaurant & accommodation is also offered in a 1900s farmhouse on the property.

References

Australian companies established in 1998
Food and drink companies established in 1998
Wineries in Tasmania
Bruny Island